Solidago verna is a species of flowering plant in the aster family known by the common names springflowering goldenrod and spring goldenrod. It is native to North Carolina and South Carolina in the United States.

Solidago verna is a perennial herb growing up to about 1.2 meters (4 feet) in height. It produces a single hairy, erect stem from a woody, branching caudex. The serrated leaves are up to 16 centimeters (6.4 inches) long and are borne on winged petioles. The inflorescence contains many bell-shaped flower heads. Each flower head contains 7-12 yellow ray florets surrounding 14-27 yellow disc florets. This species is the only goldenrod in the region that blooms in spring.

Solidago verna occurs in several types of habitat, including sandhills, pine barrens, and pocosins. The three main habitat types are pocosin ecotones, the river terraces along the Little River, and wet pine flatwoods.

Threats to the species include the loss of habitat to development and agriculture, including silviculture. Fire suppression may degrade the habitat as well.

References

External links

verna
Flora of North Carolina
Flora of South Carolina
Plants described in 1842
Taxa named by Moses Ashley Curtis
Taxa named by Asa Gray
Taxa named by John Torrey